Perth Museum and Art Gallery is the main museum and exhibition space in the city of Perth, Scotland. It is located in the Marshall Monument, named in memory of Thomas Hay Marshall, a former provost of Perth.

The museum's location was formerly the site of a late 12th-century motte and bailey castle, built in 1160 to protect the Tay crossing. A great flood in 1209 washed the Castle away. The King, William I, was staying in it at the time and had to escape with his wife and entourage by boat to Scone. The building is to be rebranded as Perth Art Gallery in 2024, with Perth City Hall becoming Perth Museum.

History

The Marshall Monument was designed by David Morison and sculpted by John Cochrane and Brothers.

Construction began in 1822, and it was opened as a library and museum by the Literary and Antiquarian Society of Perth in 1824. It is one of the United Kingdom's oldest purpose-built museums, and in 1915 it was gifted to the city by the Society on the condition that it was continued to be used only as a library or museum.

Extension

After large donations of money and paintings were bequeathed to the museum, an extension was planned for the building. In 1930 an architecture competition took place and was judged by Sir James John Burnett, a Scottish architect. A Perth firm, Smart, Stewart & Mitchell, won and the extension was begun with the laying of the foundation stone by lord provost Thomas Dempster on 2 December 1932. Work continued between 1933 and 1935, and it was opened on 10 August 1935 by the Duke and Duchess of York, the future King George VI and Queen Elizabeth. This extension housed the donated paintings as well as the Natural History collections of Perthshire Society of Natural Science which had previously been held at its museum at 62–72 Tay Street.

It was made a category B listed building in May 1965.

The museum's collection

The museum collection includes the South Corston fragment of the Strathmore meteorite and the mummy of a woman named Ta-kr-hb.

See also
List of listed buildings in Perth, Scotland

References

External links

 Culture Perth and Kinross: Perth Museum and Art Gallery

Museums in Perth, Scotland
Local museums in Scotland
Natural history museums in Scotland
Decorative arts museums in Scotland
Glass museums and galleries
Category B listed buildings in Perth and Kinross
Listed buildings in Perth, Scotland